Charles Evelyn Baring, 2nd Baron Howick of Glendale (born 30 December 1937), is a member of the Baring family and the son of Evelyn Baring, 1st Baron Howick of Glendale. He is well known as an arboriculturalist and plant collector. He is the creator of the Howick Arboretum at Howick Hall, one of the largest collections of wild origin plants in the United Kingdom. He was educated at Eton College and New College, Oxford. Baring inherited Howick Hall on the death of Charles Grey, 5th Earl Grey, who did not pass on the ownership to the 6th Earl as his heirs opted to move out instead.

He served as a director of Barings Bank (1969–82) and on the executive committee of the National Art Collections Fund. He was a director of Northern Rock plc (1987–2001). He is married to the former Clare Nicolette Darby, daughter of Col. Cyril Darby MC, of Kemerton Court. They have four married children, and fourteen grandchildren. His mother Lady Mary Cecil Grey (1907–2002) died aged 94.

Family tree

References

External links
 Howick Hall Gardens website

Barons in the Peerage of the United Kingdom
1937 births
Living people
People educated at Eton College
Alumni of New College, Oxford
English gardeners
English horticulturists
People from Northumberland
Charles
Howick of Glendale